Marvelous Marvin Hagler (born Marvin Nathaniel Hagler; May 23, 1954 – March 13, 2021) was an American professional boxer and film actor. He competed in boxing from 1973 to 1987 and reigned as the undisputed champion of the middleweight division from 1980 to 1987, making twelve successful title defenses, all but one by knockout. Hagler also holds the highest knockout percentage of all undisputed middleweight champions at 78 percent. His undisputed middleweight championship reign of six years and seven months is the second-longest active reign of the last century. He holds the record for the sixth longest reign as champion in middleweight history. Nicknamed "Marvelous" and annoyed that network announcers often did not refer to him as such, Hagler legally changed his name to "Marvelous Marvin Hagler" in 1982.

Hagler is an inductee of the International Boxing Hall of Fame and the World Boxing Hall of Fame. He was twice named Fighter of the Year by The Ring magazine and the Boxing Writers Association of America, as well as Fighter of the Decade (1980s) by Boxing Illustrated magazine. In 2001 and 2004, The Ring named him the fourth greatest middleweight of all time and in 2002 named him the 17th greatest fighter of the past 69 years. The International Boxing Research Organization rates Hagler as the sixth greatest middleweight of all time, while BoxRec rates him the 29th greatest boxer of all time, pound for pound. Many analysts and boxing writers consider Hagler to have one of the most durable chins in boxing history, having been knocked down only once during his entire professional career. The lone knockdown, scored by Juan Roldán of Argentina, is still being disputed.

Early life, family and education

Hagler was the first child of Robert Sims and Ida Mae Hagler, born on May 23, 1954. His birth year publicly came to light in 1982, when he had to state his date of birth in order to legally change from Marvin Nathaniel Hagler to Marvelous Marvin Hagler.  Hagler was raised by his mother in the Central Ward of Newark, New Jersey, United States along with five siblings: sisters Veronica, Cheryl, Genarra, and Noreen, and half brother Robbie Sims, who, like Hagler, would also become a professional boxer. Hagler first put on gloves at the age of ten, for a social worker he knew only as Mister Joe, who taught him sports and got him involved in counseling other children. Hagler dropped out of school at the age of 14 and worked in a toy factory to help support the family. Ida Mae recalled her eldest son had always wanted to box and promised one day to buy her a home. Growing up, Hagler would pretend he was Floyd Patterson or Emile Griffith.

Following the riots of 1967 in which 26 people were killed and $11 million in property damage was caused, including the destruction of the Haglers' tenement, his family moved to Brockton, Massachusetts. Hagler said that looking down on the streets at the looters was almost like watching ants on a picnic table. Ida Mae described the riots as "really terrifying" and nobody left the Hagler apartment for three days. The family lay under Veronica's bed during this time, with a pair of bullets smashing through the bedroom window, and shattering the plaster above the bed. Hagler and his siblings were forbidden from standing up by Ida Mae, who told her children to "stay away from the windows." The family crawled about the five-room apartment, sliding around on cushions to reach the bathroom and kitchen. Once the riot was over, the nearby neighborhoods were mostly in ruin, and many cars had been stripped for parts. After another riot nearly two years later, Hagler and his family got out of Newark and moved to Brockton, Massachusetts.

Amateur career
In 1969, Hagler took up boxing after being roughed up on the street by a local boxer—whom he later defeated—with his friends watching. The very next day after being roughed up, Hagler, determined to become a boxer himself, walked into a gym owned by brothers Pat and Goody Petronelli, who became his trainers and managers. As Hagler needed to be 16 in order to enter some amateur tournaments, he lied about his age, saying that he was born in 1952 instead of 1954. In May 1973, Hagler won the National AAU  title after defeating Terry Dobbs, a U.S. Marine from Atlanta, Georgia. Ahead of both Aaron Pryor and Leon Spinks, officials also voted him the 'Outstanding Boxer' of the tournament. Hagler subsequently turned professional, finishing his amateur career with a 55–1 record.

National Golden Gloves (Light Middleweight), Lowell, Massachusetts, March 1973:
 1/2: Lost to Dale Grant by decision
 United States National Championships (Middleweight), Boston, Massachusetts, May 1973:
 Finals: Defeated Terry Dobbs by decision

Professional career

Early career
Hagler was a top-ranked middleweight boxer for many years before he fought for the title. He struggled to find high-profile opponents willing to face him in his early years. Joe Frazier told Hagler, "You have three strikes against you, "You're black, you're a southpaw, and you're good." He often had to travel to his opponents' hometowns to get fights. His first break came when he was offered—on two weeks' notice—a chance against Willie 'The Worm' Monroe, who was being trained by Frazier. Hagler lost the decision but the fight was close, so Monroe gave him a rematch. This time Hagler knocked out Monroe in twelve rounds. In a third fight, he defeated Monroe in two rounds.

Boston promoter Rip Valenti took an interest in Hagler and began bringing in top ranked opponents for Hagler to face. He fought 1972 Olympic gold medalist Sugar Ray Seales; Hagler won the first time, the second was a draw and Hagler knocked Seales out in the third fight. Number one ranked Mike Colbert was knocked out in the twelfth and also had his jaw broken by Hagler. Briton Kevin Finnegan was stopped in eight and required 40 facial stitches. He dropped a controversial decision to Bobby 'Boogaloo' Watts preceding those victories, but knocked Watts out in two rounds in a rematch. Hagler won a ten-round decision over 'Bad' Bennie Briscoe, which ultimately concluded his Spectrum expedition. By then, promoter Bob Arum took notice and signed him.

First title shot
In November 1979, Hagler fought world middleweight champion Vito Antuofermo at Caesars Palace in Las Vegas, Nevada. When the fight was over after 15 rounds, most ringside observers thought that Hagler had won, even though Antuofermo had been closing the gap in the second half of the fight. Hagler claimed that referee Mills Lane told him he had won, but Lane later denied ever saying that. Hagler also noted that he and many others at ringside were surprised when the fight decision was announced as a draw. Judge Duane Ford scored the fight in Hagler's favor, 145–141. However, judge Dalby Shirley scored the bout for Antuofermo, 144–142, while judge Hal Miller scored the fight even, 143–143. This fight result only added to Hagler's frustrations, as Antuofermo retained his title with the draw. Hagler had the boxing skills and killer instinct to knock his opponent out, but instead he played it safe, as Antuofermo closed the gap late in the fight, and that late surge cost Hagler the title.

World champion
Antuofermo later lost his title to British boxer Alan Minter, who gave Hagler his second title shot. Hagler went to Wembley Arena to face Minter. The tense atmosphere was stoked further when Minter was quoted as saying that "No black man is going to take my title"—Minter later insisted he meant "that black man". Hagler took command and his slashing punches soon opened up the cut-prone Minter. With Hagler dominating the action, referee Carlos Berrocal halted the fight during the third round to have the four glaring cuts on Minter's face examined. Minter's manager, Doug Bidwell, almost immediately conceded defeat. Once Berrocal waved the bout off, a riot broke out among the spectators. Clive Gammon of Sports Illustrated described the scene as "a horrifying ululation of howls and boos." Hagler and his trainers had to be escorted to their locker room by a phalanx of policemen, all the while enduring a steady rain of beer bottles and glasses. After seven years and 50 fights, Hagler was the world middleweight champion.

Hagler proved a busy world champion. He defeated future world champion Fulgencio Obelmejias of Venezuela by a knockout in eight rounds and then former world champ Antuofermo in a rematch by TKO in four rounds. Both matches were fought at the Boston Garden near Hagler's hometown, endearing him to Boston fight fans. Syrian born Mustafa Hamsho, who later defeated three-division world champion Wilfred Benítez and future world champion Bobby Czyz, became Hagler's next challenger, putting up a lot of resistance before finally succumbing in eleven tough rounds. Michigan fighter William "Caveman" Lee lasted only one round and in a rematch in Italy, Obelmejias lasted five rounds. British champion (and mutual Alan Minter conqueror) Tony Sibson followed on Hagler's ever-growing list of unsuccessful challengers. Sibson provided one of the most entertaining (to this point) fights of Marvelous Marvin's career, but he ultimately fell short, lasting six rounds. Next came Wilford Scypion, who only lasted four. By then, Hagler was a staple on HBO, the pay-per-view of its time.

Hagler vs. Durán

A fight against Roberto Durán followed on November 10, 1983. Durán was the first challenger to last the distance with Hagler in a world-championship bout. Durán was the WBA light middleweight champion and went up in weight to challenge for Hagler's middleweight crown. Hagler won a unanimous 15-round decision, although after 13 rounds, Durán was ahead by one point on two scorecards and even on the third. Hagler, with his left eye swollen and cut, came on strong in the last two rounds to win the fight. Judge Guy Jutras scored the bout 144–142. Judge Ove Ovesen scored it 144–143. Judge Yusaku Yoshida scored it 146–145.

More title defenses
Then came Juan Roldán of Argentina, who became the only man to be credited with a knockdown of Hagler, scoring one mere seconds into the fight. Hagler protested bitterly that he had been pulled/pushed to the canvas. Hagler cut Roldan's left eye, then brutalized him over ten rounds and finally stopped him in the middle of round ten. Sugar Ray Leonard was calling the fight ringside with HBO analyst Barry Tompkins. He noted to Tompkins between rounds that Hagler looked older and slower. "Marvin might finally be slowing down, Barry," Leonard remarked. Many people believe this is the fight that gave Sugar Ray Leonard the idea that he could actually win a fight with the aging Hagler.

Hamsho was given a rematch, but the Syrian was again TKO'd, this time in only three rounds. Hamsho angered Hagler with a trio of intentional headbutts in the second round and a fourth early in the third, goading the normally patient and cautious Hagler into a full-out attack that left Hamsho battered and defenseless in a matter of seconds.

Hagler vs. Hearns

After conquering Hamsho again, Hagler met Thomas Hearns on April 15, 1985, in what was billed as The Fight; it became known as "The War".

Round One: Three minutes of violence. Within the first 15 seconds, Hearns landed his best punch, a straight right, onto Hagler's chin. The champion stepped back, then came forward. At this point, Hagler began to walk through Hearns' power punches.

Round Two: Hagler was cut on his head from an unintentional elbow or headbutt. Despite the blood, the champion continued to push the fight forward. Hearns was fighting hurt as well, having suffered a broken right hand in the last minute of the first round. The pace continued as before, but now Hearns was backing up, trying to move around the ring. Hearns' trainer Emanuel Steward later revealed Hearns had a leg massage, much to his dismay, before the fight. Hearns' legs by the end of the round were weakening.

Round Three: The pace slowed until referee Richard Steele called a time out to have the ringside doctor examine the cut on Hagler's head. The crowd was on its feet for the next ten seconds, before the doctor allowed the fight to continue. Hagler charged the much taller Hearns, drilling in an overhand right behind Hearns' ear. Hearns' legs wobbled and Hagler was on him quickly. Hearns toppled to the canvas, then rose at the count of eight, but collapsed into referee Steele's arms. The fight was then halted.

The fight lasted only eight minutes and one second, but it was regarded as a classic. Commentator Al Michaels uttered the famous line, "It didn't go very far, but it was a beauty!" The fight was named "Fight of the Year" by The Ring.

Hagler vs. Mugabi
Next was Olympic silver medalist John Mugabi of Uganda, who was 26–0 with 26 knockouts and was ranked the number one contender by all three major bodies. The fight took place on March 10, 1986, as Hagler had hurt his back and could not fight on the first date booked in 1985. Hagler stopped Mugabi in the eleventh round of a brutal fight. Many ringside observers, including analyst Gil Clancy, noticed that Hagler was showing signs of advanced ring wear and age. He was much slower of hand and foot and seemed much easier to hit. He had also completely morphed his ring style from a slick, quick-fisted, boxer/puncher to a strictly flat-footed, stalking, slugger to compensate for his loss of speed and reflexes. Hagler was now said to be seriously considering retirement. Hagler's promoter Bob Arum was quoted as saying he was expecting Hagler to retire in the face of being challenged by Sugar Ray Leonard.

Hagler vs. Leonard

Hagler's next challenger was Sugar Ray Leonard, who was returning to the ring after a three-year retirement (having fought just once in the previous five years). During the pre-fight negotiations, in return for granting Hagler a larger share of the purse, Leonard obtained several conditions which were crucial to his strategy: a  ring instead of a smaller ring,  gloves instead of  gloves, and the fight was to be over twelve rounds instead of the 15 rounds favoured by Hagler. Leonard was two years younger, had half as many fights and unbeknownst to Hagler, had engaged in several 'real' (i.e. gloves, rounds, a referee, judges and no headgear) fights behind closed doors in order to shake off his ring rust. The fight took place at Caesars Palace in Las Vegas on April 6, 1987. Hagler was the clear betting favorite after a dominant six and a half years as the reigning undisputed middleweight champion of the world, having knocked out all opponents as champion except in winning a very close unanimous decision over 15 rounds against Roberto Durán. It was Leonard's first fight at middleweight ( weight limit). The fight was to be for Hagler's WBC, lineal and Ring middleweight titles only, as the WBA stripped Hagler of their belt for choosing to face Leonard instead of WBA mandatory challenger Herol Graham. The IBF, while keeping Hagler as their champion, refused to sanction his fight against Leonard and said that the IBF middleweight title would be declared vacant if Hagler lost to Leonard.

Hagler, a natural southpaw, opened the fight boxing out of an orthodox stance. After the quick and slick Leonard won the first two rounds on all three scorecards, Hagler started the third round as a southpaw. Hagler then did much better, though Leonard's superior speed and quick flurries kept him in the fight. But by the fifth, Leonard, who was moving a lot, began to tire and Hagler started to get closer. As Leonard tired he began to clinch with more frequency (in total referee Richard Steele gave him over 30 warnings for holding, although never deducted a point). Hagler buckled Leonard's knees with a right uppercut near the end of the round, which finished with Leonard on the ropes. Hagler continued to score effectively in round six. Leonard, having slowed down, was obliged to fight more and run less.

In rounds seven and eight, Hagler's southpaw jab was landing solidly and Leonard's counter flurries were less frequent. Round nine was the most exciting round of the fight. Hagler hurt Leonard with a left cross and pinned him in a corner. Leonard was in trouble, then furiously tried to fight his way out of the corner. The action see-sawed for the rest of the round, with each man having his moments. Round ten was calmer even as Hagler continued to press forward and Leonard slowly got a second wind, as the pace slowed after the furious action of the previous round. Clearly tiring, Leonard boxed well in the eleventh. Every time Hagler scored, Leonard came back with something flashier, if not as effective. In the final round, Hagler continued to chase Leonard. He hit Leonard with a big left hand and backed him into a corner. Leonard responded with a flurry and danced away with Hagler in pursuit. The fight ended with Hagler and Leonard exchanging along the ropes. Hagler began dancing in celebration of his performance while Leonard collapsed to the canvas and raised both his arms in triumph. Leonard threw 629 punches and landed 306, while Hagler threw 792 and landed 291.

Hagler later said that, as the fighters embraced in the ring after the fight, Leonard said to him, "You beat me, man." Hagler said after the fight, "He said I beat him and I was so happy." Leonard denied making the statement and said he only told Hagler, "You're a great champion." HBO cameras and microphones supported Hagler's version of events.

Leonard was announced as the winner and new middleweight champion of the world by split decision (118–110, 115–113, 113–115), a result which remains hotly disputed to this day. The Hagler vs. Leonard fight divides fans, pundits, press and ringside observers arguably more than any other fight in boxing history, with scorecards varying as widely as 117–111 Hagler to 118–110 Leonard and everything in between. The only near universally agreed views about the fight are that Hagler was foolish for starting the fight in an orthodox stance, that Leonard won the first two rounds and that Hagler won the fifth round. Every other round in the fight divides people as to who actually won it, or if the rounds were even.

Post-fight reaction
Official ringside judge JoJo Guerra, whose scorecard of 118–110 in favour of Leonard was derided in many quarters, commented that:

Upon a second viewing of the fight, while maintaining his belief that Leonard won the fight, Guerra acknowledged that he made a mistake and should have scored two more rounds for Hagler. Duane Ford, chairman of the Nevada State Athletic Commission, commented that Guerra probably would not be invited back to Las Vegas to judge a fight in the near future.

Judge Dave Moretti, who scored it 115–113 for Leonard, said:

Judge Lou Filippo, who scored it 115–113 for Hagler and felt that Hagler's bodyshots and aggression earned him the nod, said:

Hugh McIlvanney, commenting in the British Sunday Times and Sports Illustrated:

McIlvanney also referred to Budd Schulberg's contention about a 'compound optical illusion', namely that by being the underdog and more competitive than expected against the dominant undisputed champion in Hagler meant that Leonard appeared more effective and to be doing more than he actually was. Leonard himself had said to journalists before the fight "the reason I will win is because you don't think I can". Harry Gibbs, the British judge who had been rejected by Pat Petronelli from Hagler's camp and replaced by JoJo Guerra, said he scored it 115–113 for Hagler when he watched the fight at home.

Jim Murray, long-time sports columnist for the Los Angeles Times felt that Leonard deservedly got the decision, arguing that Leonard showed better defense and ring generalship, landed more punches and writing:

The scorecards from the ringside press and broadcast media attest to the polarizing views and opinions of the fight:

Rematch
Hagler requested a rematch but Leonard chose to retire again (the third of five high-profile retirements announced by Leonard during his professional boxing career), having announced it beforehand. 14 months following their fight, Hagler retired from boxing on June 13, 1988, after watching WBA middleweight champion Sumbu Kalambay prevail over his brother, Robbie Sims, via unanimous decision. Hagler declared that he was "tired of waiting" for Leonard to grant him a rematch. Just a month succeeding Hagler's retirement, Leonard announced another boxing comeback to fight against WBC light heavyweight champion Donny Lalonde at the  super middleweight limit. In 1990, Leonard finally offered Hagler a rematch which reportedly would have earned him $15 million, but he declined. By then, Hagler had settled down into a new life as an actor in Italy and was now uninterested in his past boxing life. Hagler said "A while ago, yeah, I wanted him so bad, but I'm over that." At the 1994 Consumer Electronics Show, Hagler and Leonard had a mock rematch by playing against each other in the video game Boxing Legends of the Ring and claimed that an actual rematch was being planned, though it never happened.

Life after boxing
After the loss to Leonard, Hagler moved to Italy, where he became a well-known star of action films. His roles included a U.S. Marine in the films Indio (1989) and Indio 2 (1991). In 1997, he starred alongside Terence Hill and Giselle Blondet in Virtual Weapon. Hagler also provided boxing commentary for British television. Another foray by Hagler into the entertainment field included work on the video game Fight Night: Round 3.

Personal life and death
Hagler had five children with his first wife, Bertha: Charelle, Celeste, James, Marvin Jr. and Gentry. Although he owned a home in Bartlett, New Hampshire, Hagler lived in Milan. In May 2000, he married his second wife, Kay, an Italian, in Pioltello, Italy.

On March 13, 2021, Hagler's wife, Kay, announced that he had died of natural causes at his home in New Hampshire at the age of 66. His son James said his father was taken to a New Hampshire hospital after experiencing chest pains and difficulty breathing.

Professional boxing record

Awards and recognitions
Named Fighter of the Decade (1980s) by Boxing Illustrated
Named Boxing Writers Association of America Fighter of the Year for 1983 and 1985
Named The Ring Fighter of the Year for 1983 and 1985
Received the Golden Plate Award of the American Academy of Achievement in 1983, presented by Awards Council member Herschel Walker at a ceremony in Coronado, California
Inducted into both the International Boxing Hall of Fame and the World Boxing Hall of Fame in 1993
Awarded the Excellence Guirlande D'Honneur and was entered in the FICTS Hall Of Fame during the 2016 edition of "Sport Movies & TV – Milano International FICTS Fest"

See also
List of undisputed boxing champions
List of middleweight boxing champions
List of The Ring world champions
List of WBA world champions
List of WBC world champions
List of IBF world champions
List of left-handed boxers
List of people from Newark, New Jersey

Notes

References

External links

Marvin Hagler's amateur boxing record

2021 deaths
1954 births
African-American boxers
American expatriates in Italy
American male boxers
Boxers from Massachusetts
Boxers from Newark, New Jersey
International Boxing Federation champions
International Boxing Hall of Fame inductees
The Ring (magazine) champions
Sportspeople from Brockton, Massachusetts
Southpaw boxers
Winners of the United States Championship for amateur boxers
World Boxing Association champions
World Boxing Council champions
World middleweight boxing champions
21st-century African-American people